Jardinette Apartments, now known as Marathon Apartments, is a four-story apartment building in Hollywood, Los Angeles, California, designed by modernist Richard Neutra. It was Neutra's first commission in the United States. In his book Key Buildings of the Twentieth Century, Richard Weston called the Jardinette Apartments "one of the first Modernist buildings in America." It has also been called "America's first multi-family, International-style building."

Construction
The construction of the building was announced in a November 1927 article in the Los Angeles Times: "The Jardinette, a Class B apartment-house now under construction at Marathon street and Manhattan Place, is being erected on a site 71 by 130 feet.  This house will contain forty-three apartments and will be built at an estimated cost of $225,000." The site is one block west of Western Avenue, and one block north of Melrose Avenue.

While the building was being constructed, architect Harwell Hamilton Harris saw it and found it "unlike any building he had ever seen." It reminded him of expressionism and its reinforced concrete frame, continuous ribbon windows and cantilevered balconies intrigued Harris so much that he sought out the architect, with whom he would become friends.

Critical reception
When the Jardinette was completed in 1928, the building drew widespread attention for its radical modern design. The Christian Science Monitor said: "The new garden apartments bridge a gap between the worker's place of business and his home.  Light and sunshine flood the apartment house and create a new harmony of family life and contentment, with every room as efficiently planned for service as the most modern business office." The building was published as far as Germany and Russia. The Los Angeles Times featured the Jardinette in a 1929 article on the "New Art" of architecture in Los Angeles. At the Museum of Modern Art's famed 1932 exhibition entitled "Modern Architecture," Neutra's Jardinette Apartments was one of the few American examples included in the exhibition.

Design

The Jardinette building was Neutra's first commission in Los Angeles. Like the Lovell House, which Neutra designed around the same time, the Jardinette is composed of "box-like forms, flat roofs, unbroken horizontal windows alternating with plain, banded spandrels extended to form balconies." However, Jardinette differs from Lovell House in construction. Neutra chose reinforced concrete for Jardinette, with long spans of reinforced concrete allowing for unbroken window strips. The original design also included rooftop gardens.

The building's main structure runs east to west along the back of the site, with two short wings at either end forming a shallow courtyard. The design was intended to convey a sense of openness: "Everything about the building speaks of condensed, efficient forms whose edges dissolve into the landscape." A writer for Art and Culture noted, "The Jardinette is a perfect example of the Modernist trend at the time."

The Jardinette was intended as a prototype for a series of garden apartments to be built in Hollywood. However, the developer, Joseph H. Miller, went bankrupt during the construction of Jardinette, and the other buildings were never realized.

One of the key features that set the Jardinette apart from other apartment buildings built in Los Angeles in the 1920s was the lack of ornamentation. The Los Angeles Times has written that the Jardinette represents the roots of Neutra's radical, free-form style. "This was radical architecture.  It was without ornament, made out of industrial materials, and bold in its sculptural openness.  Areas flowed from inside to outside, and glass made the artificially lush landscape of California seem to float into the very heart of each of the architect's buildings."

Later decline
In recent years, the Jardinette has fallen into a state of neglect. In 1992, the Los Angeles Times wrote: "Today, the Jardinette is somewhat neglected and forlorn. . . . One can only hope that someday soon the Jardinette, inhabited by mere mortals who enjoy efficiency and sunlight, will be restored to its original abstract splendor." In 2005, the LA Weekly described the building as a "depressing" complex and suggested that its residents "may never guess that their cellblock-like building on a dismal and forsaken street is a landmark of modernism."

Building gutted
In December 2020 the Jardinette Apartments was bought by Cameron Hassid of Apollo Capital, based in Beverly Hills, CA.

Historic designations
 In 1986, the Jardinette was listed in the National Register of Historic Places.
 In 1986, the Jardinette was registered with the State of California's Office of Historic Preservation.
 In 1988, the Jardinette was designated as a Historic-Cultural Landmark by the City of Los Angeles.

See also
 Los Angeles Historic-Cultural Monuments in Hollywood
List of Registered Historic Places in Los Angeles

References

External links

Video of Jardinette Apartments

Richard Neutra buildings
Apartment buildings in Los Angeles
Buildings and structures in Hollywood, Los Angeles
Los Angeles Historic-Cultural Monuments
Residential buildings on the National Register of Historic Places in Los Angeles
Residential buildings completed in 1928
Culture of Hollywood, Los Angeles
International style architecture in California
Modernist architecture in California